"The Lorelais' First Day At Chilton" is the second episode of the first season of the American comedy-drama series Gilmore Girls. It originally aired on the WB in the United States on October 12, 2000. The episode was written by series creator Amy Sherman-Palladino and directed by Arlene Sanford.

Synopsis
Lorelai oversleeps on Rory's first day at Chilton and discovers that all her good clothes are in the cleaners. She throws on a tie-dyed top, Daisy Duke shorts, and cowboy boots. On the way to the headmaster's office, Lorelai meets Ian, the father of a Chilton student. Lorelai and Ian have some initial chemistry until Rory reminds Lorelai how she looks in her shorts and cowboy boots. 

When Lorelai and Rory arrive at Headmaster Charleston's office, they find Emily, who has shown up for Rory's first day. Lorelai is coerced into removing her coat, and Emily and the Headmaster see her outfit. Both make judgmental expressions though refrain from saying anything about it. Lorelai and Emily leave after some awkward moments in the headmaster's office, bickering the entire way out.

Rory meets the school's office manager who tells Rory about the school's culture and obtaining extra credit in the course of her school day, including singing the school song in Latin. Rory begins to look apprehensive about what she has taken on. Meanwhile, a student volunteer working in the office hands Rory's file out the window to Paris, Madeline and Louise. Paris peruses Rory's file and attempts to downplay Rory's achievements, but it's clear that Paris is somewhat nervous about the new competitor to her academic successes.

Rory's day goes downhill from there. She is handed a three-inch binder containing one week's worth of notes from one class and meets some insufferable classmates including Paris Geller, who sees Rory as a rival and tells her that she is the smartest student, and Tristin, who teases Rory by incessantly calling her "Mary." Later, Rory ruins Paris's class project as she tries to open her locker and begins to answer questions Paris would usually answer, further provoking her rage.

Meanwhile, in Stars Hollow, Luke chastises Lorelai for her wardrobe choice. Later Ian, a man Lorelai met that morning at Chilton, comes by the Inn to ask her to dinner, but she declines because he is a "Chilton Dad."

At the end of the day, Lorelai picks Rory up from Chilton with coffee in hand, and they commiserate about their bad days.

Cast

Starring
 Lauren Graham as Lorelai Gilmore
 Alexis Bledel as Rory Gilmore
 Melissa McCarthy as Sookie St. James
 Keiko Agena as Lane Kim
 Yanic Truesdale as Michel Gerard
 Scott Patterson as Luke Danes
 Kelly Bishop as Emily Gilmore
 Edward Herrmann as Richard Gilmore (special appearance by) (credit only)

Guest Starring
 Ted Rooney as Morey Dell
 Alex Borstein as Drella
 Sally Struthers as Babette Dell
 Liz Torres as Patricia "Miss Patty" LaCosta

 Jackson Douglas as Jackson Melville

 Dakin Matthews as Hanlin Charleston
 Chad Michael Murray as Tristin DuGray
 Liza Weil as Paris Geller
 Shelly Cole as Madeline Lynn
 Teal Redmann as Louise Grant

Reception
While rewatching the series, David Sims of The A.V. Club wrote: "Of all the early season-one episodes that see Gilmore Girls finding its groove, this is definitely the weakest."

References

External links
 

Gilmore Girls episodes
2000 American television episodes